Wladislaw Laudas Jozef "Duke" Dukowski (August 31, 1900 — September 26, 1976) was a professional ice hockey player who played 206 games in the National Hockey League between 1926 and 1934. He played defense for the New York Rangers, New York Americans, and Chicago Black Hawks. His middle initial is sometimes erroneously stated as "S" when in fact his middle name was Joseph.

Personal life
Dukowski was married and had four children. He was a salesman during the summer. Before playing hockey, he also played baseball, rugby and football.

Amateur career
Dukowski played senior amateur hockey for the Regina Pats before switching to the Regina Vics and winning championships with that team in 1919, 1920, and 1921.

Career statistics

Regular season and playoffs

References

External links
 
 

1900 births
1976 deaths
Canadian ice hockey defencemen
Chicago Blackhawks captains
Chicago Blackhawks players
Ice hockey people from Saskatchewan
Kansas City Pla-Mors players
New Haven Eagles players
New York Americans players
New York Rangers players
Portland Rosebuds players
Regina Capitals players
Regina Pats players
Saskatoon Sheiks players
Sportspeople from Regina, Saskatchewan
Syracuse Stars (IHL) players